Korayar River is one of the tributaries of the river Kalpathipuzha, which in turn is a main tributary of the Bharathapuzha River, the second-longest river in Kerala, south India.  It originates from Anamalai, Tamilnadu and merges with Walayar which later converges with Bharathapuzha at Pattambi.

References

See also
Bharathapuzha - Main river
Kalpathipuzha - One of the main  tributaries of the river Bharathapuzha

Other tributaries
 Korayar
 Varattar
 Walayar
 Malampuzha

Bharathappuzha